Willie Lee Williams Jr. (born August 6, 1967) is a former American football offensive tackle who played two seasons in the National Football League (NFL) with the Phoenix Cardinals and New Orleans Saints. He was drafted by the Phoenix Cardinals in the ninth round of the 1990 NFL Supplemental Draft. He played college football at Louisiana State University and attended Phillis Wheatley High School in Houston, Texas. Williams was also a member of the Amsterdam Admirals and Toronto Argonauts.

College career
Williams played college football as a tight end for the LSU Tigers.

Professional career
Williams was selected by the Phoenix Cardinals of the NFL in the ninth round of the 1990 NFL Supplemental Draft. He played in sixteen games, starting three, for the Cardinals in 1991. He played in sixteen games, starting five, for the NFL's New Orleans Saints in 1994. Williams was selected by the Amsterdam Admirals of the World League of American Football (WLAF) in the second round of the 1996 WLAF Draft and played for them during the 1996 season. He played in 33 games for the Toronto Argonauts of the CFL from 1997 to 1998.

References

External links
Just Sports Stats
College stats
Fanbase profile

Living people
1967 births
American football offensive tackles
Canadian football offensive linemen
American football tight ends
African-American players of American football
African-American players of Canadian football
LSU Tigers football players
Phoenix Cardinals players
New Orleans Saints players
Amsterdam Admirals players
Toronto Argonauts players
Players of American football from Houston
Players of Canadian football from Houston
21st-century African-American people
20th-century African-American sportspeople